Abhinav Bali (born 2 June 1985) is an Indian first-class cricketer who plays for Himachal Pradesh.

References

External links
 

1985 births
Living people
Indian cricketers
Delhi cricketers
Himachal Pradesh cricketers
Cricketers from Delhi
Delhi Giants cricketers
Cricketers banned for corruption